Mamono Hunter Yōko: Dai 7 no Keishō (魔物ハンター妖子 第7の警鐘) is a platform game developed by Klon and published by NCS Masaya for the Sega Mega Drive in 1991 exclusively in Japan. It is an adaptation of the manga and anime series Devil Hunter Yohko.

Gameplay
It is a side-scrolling platform game in which the player take the role of the titular protagonist Yoko, who is armed with a sword. If the attack button is held, Yoko's sword will create a protective shield around her, which can also be thrown at enemies. However, projectiles can break their way through the shield if it receives consistent damage. Players are given a life bar that drops when Yoko receives damage, then slowly regenerates. There are intro and cut scenes between levels.

Plot

Reception

The game received mixed reviews, including being rated 46% by German magazine PowerPlay and 88% by French magazine Joystick.

References

External links
Mamono Hunter Yōko: Dai 7 no Keishō at MobyGames

1991 video games
Japan-exclusive video games
Magical girl video games
Masaya Games games
Side-scrolling platform games
Sega Genesis games
Sega Genesis-only games
Single-player video games
Video games based on anime and manga
Video games developed in Japan
Video games featuring female protagonists
Video games scored by Atsuhiro Motoyama
Video games set in Japan